The Jodhra are a Muslim tribe found in the Punjab province of Pakistan, closely allied by blood to the neighboring Ghebas also. Both Jodhra and Gheba were warrior tribes of Sikhs and later they converted from Sikhism to Islam.

References

Bibliography 

Punjabi tribes